Kondevoor is a small village in Uppala, Kasaragod district, Kerala state, India.

Landmarks
Kondevoor is known for Shri Gayathri Matha Temple and Sadguru Shree Nithyananda Vidyapeeta High School, a higher secondary school with about 350 students, both national and international. The school is under the administration of Shri Nithyananda Yogashrama.

Languages
This locality is an essentially multi-lingual region. The people speak Malayalam, Kannada, Tulu, Beary bashe and Konkani. Migrant workers also speak Hindi and Tamil languages.

Administration
This village is part of Manjeswaram assembly constituency which is again part of Kasaragod (Lok Sabha constituency)

Transportation
Local roads have access to National Highway No.66 which connects to Mangalore in the north and Calicut in the south.  The nearest railway station is Manjeshwar on Mangalore-Palakkad line. There is an airport at Mangalore.

References

Manjeshwar area